Arsenal Street may refer to:

 Arsenal Street, St. Louis, Missouri, U.S.
 Arsenal Street Bridge, connecting Arsenal Street in Watertown, Massachusetts to Western Avenue in Allston, Boston, Massachusetts, U.S.
 Arsenal Street, Wan Chai, Hong Kong, the location of Hong Kong Police Headquarters

Odonyms referring to a building